Karl Piehl (1853–1904) was a Swedish Egyptologist.

Biography
He was born in Stockholm. He was docent in Egyptian languages at Uppsala University in 1881, became director of the Egyptian Museum in 1889, and in 1893 was appointed to a newly endowed chair of Egyptology. Three years afterwards Piehl became editor of the Sphinx, a periodical of Egyptian archaeology.

Works
 Petites études égyptologiques (1881)
 Dictionnaire du papyrus Harris No. 1 (1882)
 Inscriptions hiéroglyphiques (1884 sqq.)

References
 

1853 births
1904 deaths
Swedish Egyptologists
Academic staff of Uppsala University
Scientists from Stockholm